Christine Jasoni  is an American-born New Zealand academic specialising in foetal neural development. She is a professor at the University of Otago and has been the director of the university's Brain Health Research Centre since 2016. In 2020 she was elected a Ngā Takahoa a Te Apārangi Companion of Royal Society Te Apārangi.

Jasoni has a BSc from the University of California and a PhD from the University of Washington. She moved to New Zealand in 2001.

Selected works

References

External links 

 

Living people
Academic staff of the University of Otago
New Zealand medical researchers
New Zealand women academics
Year of birth missing (living people)

University of California alumni
University of Washington alumni
American emigrants to New Zealand
Companions of the Royal Society of New Zealand